Oranjehof or Oranjehof Dutch Connection Centre is one of the two museums that are part of the multi-cultural, multi-purpose visitor and community hub Te Awahou Nieuwe Stroom in Foxton, New Zealand, just over an hour's drive north of Wellington.

The award-winning facility is also the home of the Piriharakeke Generation Inspiration Centre, a library, community rooms, a gallery, a heritage room, a Council Service Centre and an i-SITE desk.

The Oranjehof museum was created with wide support from the Dutch community in New Zealand. The museum, is a centre for Dutch culture, language, community, and depicts the story of the Dutch in New Zealand.

Oranjehof is an integral part of the Te Awahou Riverside Cultural Park, which also features two Dutch-inspired cafes, and a flour-grinding windmill, De Molen.

The Dutch Connection Museum Trust collaborated in partnership with Horowhenua District Council, and the Te Taitoa Māori o Te Awahou Trust to create the Te Awahou Nieuwe Stroom facility - the home of the Oranjehof Dutch Connection Centre.

An Unknown Story 

The Dutch – and their children and grandchildren – helped change New Zealand to a more diverse, multi-cultural nation since the 1950s and 1960s. They arrived as the first big wave of non-English speaking immigrants, in what was then still a strongly British nation.

Dutch migrants were issued an ‘Alien Pass’ and told to become ‘New Britishers’. The directive from both Dutch and New Zealand Governments was to merge into mainstream society. It became the norm to ignore the culture of origin, and speak English at home.

Invisible Immigrants 

As a result, the Dutch became the ‘Invisible Immigrants’, as they integrated into mainstream society. In a way, the Dutch migrants are missing from the pages of history. Michael King, in his Penguin ‘History of New Zealand’ tells the story of all migrant groups – except the Dutch. Oranjehof is the place that addresses that omission.

Today, at least one in every 40 or so New Zealanders has some Dutch heritage or connections. These hard-working arrivals influenced the tastes of a nation – in the arts, dance, religion, and food. Oranjehof tells those eye-opening stories in interactive ways, which include digital displays and hands-on games.

The history of the Dutch in Aotearoa goes all the way back to Tasman's arrival in 1642, some 127 years before Captain Cook.

Oranjehof Museum 

Oranjehof is a museum that is quintessential Dutch, with a colourful sense of humour of its own, plenty of gezelligheid, and a sense of clear Dutch design.

Dutch artists represented, include photographer Ans Westra, sculptor Leon van den Eijkel, and ceramicists Anneke Borren and Melis van der Sluis. Designers include fashion icon Doris de Pont and Carpay who did innovative work for Crown Lynn and also had a major impact on textile and graphic design.

Dutch Connections 
The story of the Dutch in New Zealand touches on many aspects of Kiwi life. The origins of Vogel's bread, Verkerks salami, and artisan Gouda and Edam cheeses are all Dutch.  Many New Zealanders have lived in a Lockwood home, or drank coffee at Coffee Lounge – the ‘Queen of the Coffee Houses’ in Wellington.

A ‘touch of Dutch’ can be found just about anywhere in New Zealand – even in the country's name, due to the arrival of Abel Tasman and the first European encounter with the Maori.

The Exhibition and collection 

Oranjehof preserves Dutch heritage – history, treasures, art, language, identity, culture, Nederlandse dingen.
As the Dutch Connection Centre, it is the centrepoint for the Dutch community in New Zealand.

Oranjehof showcases:
 Tasman's travels  – The first meeting of two worlds, Māori and Pākehā
 The story of why so many Nederlanders ventured to Aotearoa
 The Dutch influence on art and design - And on coffee culture, cheese making, agriculture and dairy
 Nederlandse Taal – You can listen to Dutch language on Dutch radio
 Traditional games - Plus dress up costumes for selfies

De Molen Windmill 

The full size replica of a Dutch windmill, De Molen, was completed and opened in 2003 and underwent some major repairs in 2018.

De Molen is the result of Netherlands-New Zealand collaboration. Running gear, millstones and sails were produced and installed by Vaags Molenwerken in Aalten, the Netherlands. The mill was built largely by volunteers, under the direction of local builder Cor Slobbe. The 17th century design with wooden beams is impressive to behold, especially when the mill is creaking loudly and the parts are moving, as it grinds flour on windy days.

The fully working Stellingmolen windmill produces stone-ground flour, which can be purchased inside the mill's Dutch Deli. Visitors can climb up three floors, to witness the wooden mechanical workings of the mill in action - examples of traditional Dutch 17th Century engineering. The miller sets the blades in motion on windy days, and is available for tours to explain the history of milling, or for a more casual conversation.

Further reading

References  

Museums in Manawatū-Whanganui
History of New Zealand
Māori
Immigrants to New Zealand
Foxton, New Zealand
Dutch New Zealander
History museums in New Zealand